This is a list of major music awards and nominations received by Nigerian singer Tiwa Savage.

Awards table

Notes

References

Tiwa Savage